Sobti is a Punjabi Khatri clan. They owned several villages in Gujrat district of West Punjab (now in Pakistan) where they practiced both agriculture and trading. These villages including the village Bath in the pargana of Gujrat, and the village of Qasimpur Lakhu were owned by them from the time around the reign of Farrukhsiyar. They trace their ancestry to the village of Jalalpur Sobtian in Gujrat district, Punjab. They were also found in the town of Alamgarh in Gujrat district.

According to a local legend, King Sophytes (Saubati) who fought against Alexander the Great was from the Sobti clan of Khatri.  Bhai Daya Singh, a Panj Pyara was the first man to sacrifice his head for Guru Gobind Singh.

Notable people 

 Atul Sobti, chairman and MD at BHEL
 Barun Sobti, Indian model and actor
 Krishna Sobti, Indian Hindi-language fiction writer
 Praveen Kumar Sobti, Asian Games gold medalist in discus throw and hammer throw.
 Ranbir Chander Sobti, Indian cell biologist. He is a former vice chancellor of the Panjab University, Chandigarh
 Tarun Sobti, Vice Admiral in Indian navy

References 

Surnames
Indian surnames
Punjabi-language surnames
Surnames of Indian origin
Hindu surnames
Khatri clans
Khatri surnames